The West Coast Conference women's basketball tournament is the annual concluding tournament for the NCAA college basketball in the West Coast Conference.  The winner receives an automatic berth into the NCAA Women's Basketball Championship. The championship is broadcast nationally on ESPNU.

Games were at campus sites from 1992-1994, then were played at the same location as the men's tournament, beginning in 1995.

Beginning in 2012, the WCC adopted a new format to incorporate a ninth team (BYU). In 2012 and 2013, the tournament started on Wednesday instead of Friday, and a first round 8 vs. 9 game was added. The winner of the 8/9 game played the 5 seed on Day 2 of the Tournament (Thursday). The 6 vs. 7 match took place that same day. Day 3, or the Quarterfinals (Friday), featured the winner of the 5/8/9 game playing the 4 seed and the winner of the 6/7 game playing the 3 seed. The top two seeds entered in the semifinals on Saturday. All teams were off on Sunday (all WCC members are private, faith-based schools, and BYU has a strict policy against Sunday play), and the championship game was played Monday on ESPNU. BYUtv Sports showed all games on the women's side except for the championship.

The format changed to a traditional 10-team tournament with the addition of Pacific for the 2013–14 season.

At the end of each tournament, an all-tournament team is named, with one individual selected as Most Valuable Player. Four players have earned MVP honors more than once—Valerie Gillom of San Francisco, Jill Barta of Gonzaga, and Alex Fowler of Portland twice each; and Gonzaga's Courtney Vandersloot three times.

Past WCC women's basketball tournament results

Performance by school

References

See also

West Coast Conference men's basketball tournament